Tanner Stransky is a journalist and television critic for Entertainment Weekly. In 2005, he moved to New York City and took a job as an editorial assistant at Direct TV. He later received an offer from the New York Post to write about weddings and relationships. During this time, he remained in contact with the intern director at Entertainment Weekly, having been denied an internship twice during college. This helped him secure a job at the publication a year after moving to New York. Stransky also worked at Teen People. In 2008, Stransky published a book entitled Find Your Inner Ugly Betty, which provides career advice inspired by television series, including Ugly Betty, Grey's Anatomy, and The Office.

Education 
 
Stransky attended Drake University in Des Moines, IA.

References

External links
 Official website

Living people
Year of birth missing (living people)